Bulb Records is a Michigan-based record label that was formed in 1993 by Peter Larson (now of the two-piece metal rock band 25 Suaves), and James Magas (now known simply as Magas).

The label had originally started putting out records by local Michigan avant-garde musical acts, but had later added extended its roster to nationally and internationally known artists.

Artists

Andrew W.K.
Wolf Eyes
Deuce (singer)
Couch
Danse Asshole
Duotron
25 Suaves
Mr. Quintron
Forcefield
Math
Mindflayer
Oakley Hall
Black Elf Speaks
Elvish Presley
The USA Is A Monster
King Brothers
Galen
Prehensile Monkeytailed Skink.

Discography
Bulb Records' first release was actually catalog number BLB-026. Larson and Magas chose this number to make it appear as though they had more records out at the time. This has resulted in many gaps in the Bulb catalog, and much confusion over release dates.

Steev Mike 7-inch (Unofficial Item of Interest)
BLB-001 BULB/BLACKJACK split #1
BLB-002 BULB/BLACKJACK split #2 
BLB-003/OVR-003 COUCH/BULLET IN THE HEAD split 12-inch EP 
BLB-004 Mr. Velocity Hopkins "Das Boot" cassette (a CHOCOLATE MONK release)
BLB-005 PREHENSILE MONKEYTAILED SKINK "I am a gorilla" 7-inch (Blackjack Records) 
BLB-006/Insignificant MR. VELOCITY HOPKINS Self Titled/ "In Space" CD
BLB-007 Duotron "The complete illustrated book of..." (a SCRATCH RECORDS release) CD
PV2/BLB012 King Brothers "Live in America" - Video 
BLB-013 The Monarchs - "In Mono" 7-inch
BLB015 25 Suaves "s/t" CDR
BLB016 Dance Asshole I
BLB017 Dance Asshole II
BLB018 Dance Asshole III 
BLB019 Dance Asshole IV 
BLB020 Dance Asshole V 
BLB021 DANCE ASSHOLE 0
BLB023 SUFFUCKATORS "Suffuckation Nation""s/t" Cassette 
BLB-026 COUCH - "s/t" 7-inch 
BLB-027 PREHENSILE MONKEYTAILED SKINK "We Found a 4-Trak" 7-inch 
BLB-028 CORNELIUS GOMEZ - "s/t" 7-inch
BLB-029 PREHENSILE MONKEYTAILED SKINK - "Midnight Dynamite" 7-inch
BLB-030 BULLET IN THE HEAD - 7-inch
BLB-031 SHRIEK - "Bunnies" 7-inch
BLB-032 MATH - "Bask Math" CD 
BLB-033 The MONARCHS - "Play For you" 7-inch EP 
BLB-034 IN BULB O PHONIC compilation CD
BLB-035 THE TWEEZERS- Electric Servant of Everyman" 7-inch EP 
BLB-036 The DEMOLITION DOLL RODS- 7-inch
BLB-037 MR. VELOCITY HOPKINS/ The MANY MOODS OF MARLON MAGAS- split 7-inch EP
BLB-038 GALEN- "The Heroin Bench"  7-inch
BLB-039 QUINTRON - "I.F. 001-011" LP 
BLB-040 DUOTRON - "We modern, We Now!" LP
BLB-041 COUCH- "Glass Brothers" CD 
BLB-042 QUINTRON - "The Amazing Spellcaster" LP 
BLB-043 TEMPLE OF BON MATIN- "Enduro" CD 
BLB-044 Quintron/Flossie and the Unicorns - "M.C. Baby Kitty/Snow machine" split 7-inch
BLB-045 INCAPACITANTS "Asset Without Liability" CD
BLB-046 DUOTRON "Battalia Feminil!" LP 
BLB-047 PTERODACTYLS - "Reborn"  CD
BLB-049 MR. QUINTRON- "The first two records" CD 
BLB-051 Mr. Quintron "Satan is Dead"  LP
BLB-052  Mr. QUINTRON "Satan is Dead"  CD
BLB-053 YOKOZUNA ICHIBAN- "Dismay" CD 
BLB-054 TEMPLE OF BON MATIN-"Bullet into Mesmer's Brain" CD 
BLB-055 25 SUAVES-"Chinese Students Study Abroad!" 7-inch
BLB-056 KING BROTHERS- CD
BLB-057 KING BROTHERS- LP
PV01/BLB-058 GASOLINE Video
BLB-059 25 SUAVES - CD
BLB-060 KING BROTHERS- 7-inch
BLB-061 Mikey Wild "I  Was Punk Before You Were" CD
BLB-062  QUINTRON - "The Amazing Spellcaster" CD
BLB-063 VOODOO BOOTS (Japan Rock 7-inch series #1) Japan Rock Series 7-inch
BLB-064 Mr. Quintron (BULB GOLD REISSUE series #2)"I.F. 001-011" CD
BLB-065 Wolf Eyes "Fortune Dove" 12-inch
BLB-068 Andrew W.K. "Girls Own Juice" CD
BLB-069 WOLF EYES “Wolf Eyes” CD
BLB-072 QUINTRON "The Unmasked Organ Light-Year of Infinity Man" LP
BLB-073DX ANDREW W.K. "Party Til You Puke" 12-inch/CD
BLB-074 TEMPLE OF BON MATIN "Cabin in the Sky" LP 
BLB-075 MC TRACHIOTOMY "w/Love From Tahiti" CD 
BLB-076 ASS BABOONS OF VENUS "Phuket ala Bum Bum" CD 
BLB-078 25 SUAVES/ONEIDA "Street People" Split Live LP 
BLB-079 WOLF EYES "DREAD" CD 
BLB-082 25 SUAVES "1938" CD 
BLB-083 25 SUAVES "1938" LP 
BLB-084 MIND FLAYER "Take Your Skin Off" LP
BLB-085 MIND FLAYER "Take Your Skin Off" CD
BLB-087 FORCE FIELD "Lord of the Rings Modulator" 2LP/CD
BLB-088 BULB SINGLES #1 CD
BLB-089 TERRIFYING SICKOS "s/t" LP 
BLB-091 TODD s/t CD
BLB-092 BULB SINGLES #2 CD 
BLB-094 ELVISH PRESLEY "Black Elf Speaks" CD 
BLB-095 ROITAN s/t CD
BLB-097 OAKLEY HALL s/t CD
BLB-098 PEARLS AND BRASSS Limited Edition LP 
BLB-099 25 SUAVES "I Want it Loud" CD

Videos

PV2/BLB012 King Brothers "Live in America" - Video 
VLB-026 PREHENSILE MONKEYTAILED SKINK "Fear of Practice" Video
VLB-027 MR. VELOCITY HOPKINS- "Franco-Prussian War" Video
VLB-028/VLB-002 THE PTERODACTYLS - "Self-Titled" Video

Live at the Bulb Clubhouse CD-R Series

Nautical Almanac/Meerk Puffy 
Prurient 
Temple of Bon Matin 
 36 
 Suffuckators 
 25 Suaves
 Fat Day
 Mind Flayer
 King Brothers
 Wolf Eyes 
 Kites
 Sightings

See also 
 List of record labels

References

External links
 Bulb Record's Official site

American record labels
Record labels based in Michigan
Record labels established in 1992